The Sony Building was designed by Japanese architect Yoshinobu Ashihara, and opened on April 29, 1966 in Tokyo's Ginza district (Chūō-ku). It is located at the Sukiyabashi crossroads on Harumi-dori, and is accessible directly from the Ginza subway station via exit B9. The building is an example of Postmodern architecture.

Another unusual feature of this building is that it leaves a small square facing the intersection open, creating a performance/display space that the architect referred to as "Sony Square".

A major renovation was made in 1992, with the exterior restored to its original condition. Exterior louvers and tiles were replaced, new entrance doors were installed, and the small square at the corner of the intersection was renovated. The original facade, a light display consisting of a large number of 5-inch cathode ray tubes, was replaced with 74 aluminum panels. Interior renovation was done at this time as well.

The Sony Building closed on March 31, 2017 and was demolished on the same year and the new Sony Building will be built on this same location, and will open in 2022. During this period, the land will be turned into a park for recreational use through the summer of 2020, when the Tokyo Olympic and Paralympic Games were set to take place.

See also
Sony Building (New York)

References

External links
Official Sony Building Site

Buildings and structures completed in 1966
Buildings and structures demolished in 2017
1966 establishments in Japan
Buildings and structures in Chūō, Tokyo
Ginza
Sony